Alejandro Posadas (December 28, 1870 – November 21, 1902) was an Argentinian physician and surgeon specializing in pediatric surgery. He was the first person to film an operation and brought the first x-ray to the country of Argentina.

Posadas was the first person to describe coccidioidomycosis (later known as Posadas Disease) and Coccidioides posadasii was named after him.

A victim of tuberculosis, he died while studying in France in 1902 at the age of 31.

Legacy
Hospital Nacional Dr. Alejandro Posadas in Moron, Argentina, is named after him.

References

Further reading

1870 births
1902 deaths
Argentine surgeons